Gusau Airstrip or Gusau Airfield  is an airstrip serving Gusau, the capital city of the Zamfara State in Nigeria.

See also
Transport in Nigeria
List of airports in Nigeria

References

External links
OurAirports - Gusau
SkyVector Aeronautical Charts
OpenStreetMap - Gusau

Airports in Nigeria
Zamfara State